Evreşe is a town (belde) in the Gelibolu District, Çanakkale Province, Turkey. Its population is 2,098 (2021).

References

Populated places in Çanakkale Province
Gelibolu District